The Charleston City Lions were a travel team in the American Basketball Association based in Charleston, South Carolina that began play in the 2012-13 ABA season.

Formerly called the Electric City Lions, they were based in Anderson, South Carolina for the 2012–13 before moving to nearby Charleston because the team owners, Marquis and Azure Agnew, did not feel that they did a good job in Anderson, despite having been ranked in the league's top 32 list at various points in the season. The move will also help their fellow team, the Greenville Galaxy, have a wider fanbase.

References

External links
Electric City Lions official website

Defunct American Basketball Association (2000–present) teams
Basketball teams in South Carolina
Anderson, South Carolina
Basketball teams established in 2012
Basketball in Charleston, South Carolina
2012 establishments in South Carolina